Vince Lee may refer to:

 Vince Lee (explorer), (born 1938). American explorer
 Vince Weiguang Li (born 1968), Chinese Canadian man responsible for the murder of Tim McLean